The Athenia  Stakes is a Grade III American Thoroughbred horse race for fillies and mares age three-years-old and older run over at a distance of a mile and an eighth on the turf held annually in October at Belmont Park in Elmont, New York. The event offers a purse of $175,000.

History
The Athenia Stakes is named in honor of Hal Price Headley's filly Athenia, who won in 1946 the Ladies Handicap over the distance of  miles as well as the Misty Isle Handicap and Artful Handicap at Washington Park Race Track in Chicago. Athenia also was the granddam of Sir Ivor, the 1968 Horse of the Year in the United Kingdom and Leading broodmare sire in Britain & Ireland in 1983. 

The inaugural running of the event was on 13 September 1978 as The Athenia Handicap for three-year-old fillies at  miles in distance and was won by the Terpsichorist who was trained by the US Hall of Fame trainer Woody Stephens and ridden by Michael Venezia in a time of 2:03. The event continued to be restricted to three-year-old fillies until 1983.

In 1980 the event was classified as Grade III. In 2005 the event was moved to the main track due to the inclement weather and consequently was downgraded.

The race has been held at Aqueduct Racetrack several times with the last such running in 2004.
 
The event was raced in split divisions in 1982 and 2001.

The event has been contested at various distances over its history with the current distance of  miles being reinstated in 2021.

The event in 2022 was moved to Aqueduct Racetrack due to infield tunnel and redevelopment work at Belmont Park.

Records
Speed  record: 
 miles: 1:39.94 – Pianist (2013)
 miles: 1:47.11  –  Rapid Selection (1997)
 miles: 2:00.40  – Love Sign (1980), De La Rosa (1981)
 miles: 2:13.20 – Capades (1989)

Margins: 
20 lengths – Rose Crescent (1983)
 
Most wins:
 2 – Babae (2001, 2002)

Most wins by an owner:
 2 – Rokeby Stables (1983, 1988)
 2 – Harbor View Farm (1994, 1995)
 2 – Joseph Platt Jr. (2001, 2002)
 2 – Juddmonte Farms (1991, 2021)

Most wins by a jockey:
 6 – Jorge F. Chavez (1994, 1999, 2000, 2001, 2002, 2005)

Most wins by a trainer:
 7 – Chad C. Brown (2013, 2016, 2017, 2018, 2020, 2021, 2022)

Winners

Legend:

:See also
 List of American and Canadian Graded races

References

Graded stakes races in the United States
Grade 3 stakes races in the United States
Horse races in New York (state)
Mile category horse races for fillies and mares
Recurring sporting events established in 1978
Belmont Park
1978 establishments in New York (state)
Turf races in the United States